Laroche Wines is a French-based wine company. The Laroche family has been producing wine in Chablis since 1850, but the first vintage did not come until 1860.  In 1950s and 1960s, the vineyards were hit hard by Phylloxera and spring frost, meaning there were virtually no production.  In the 2000s, the entire Laroche Wines Chablis range became fully enclosed by screw caps rather than corks, including the Chablis Grand Crus, becoming the first House in France to do so.

Wineries
Today Laroche owns four wineries:
 Domaine Laroche in Chablis, France
 Mas La Chevalière in the south of France
 Viña Punto Alto in the Casablanca valley in Chile
 L'Avenir in Stellenbosch, South Africa

References

External links
 http://www.larochewines.com/

Burgundy (historical region) wine producers
Wineries of France
Wineries of Chile